is a category of kami in Japanese mythology. Generally speaking, it refers to kami born in, or residing in, Takamagahara. 

Modern Shinto no longer makes the distinction between Amatsukami and Kunitsukami. According to Yijiang Zhong the distinction was made by the writers of the Nihon Shoki and the Kojiki to formulate a political discourse.

Mythology

Amatsukami refers to kami residing in Takamagahara, along with kami who were born in Takamagahara but later descended to Japan. In the mythological event of kuni-yuzuri, the descendants of amatsukami descended to pacify the world, which was occupied by the kunitsukami. In Shinto practice, there is no clear distinction between amatsukami and kunitsukami, as their definitions change with time and in different source materials.

List of amatsukami

Kotoamatsukami
 Amenominakanushi
 Takamimusubi
 Kamimusubi
 Umashi'ashikabihikoji
 Amenotokotachi
Kamiyonanayo
Kuninotokotachi
Toyo-kumono-no-kami
Uhijini and Suhijini
Tsunuguhi and Ikuguhi 
Ōtonoji and Ōtonobe
Omodaru and Aya-kashiko-ne
Izanagi 
Shusaishin
Amaterasu
Others
Ame-no-oshihomimi
Ninigi
Takemikazuchi
Omoikane
Ame-no-Koyane
Ame-no-Uzume
Ame-no-Tajikarao
Tamanooya
Futodama
Ame-no-Wakahiko
Ame-no-Hohi

See also 

 Heavenly and Earthly crimes
 Aesir and Vanir

References

Shinto terminology
Shinto kami
Types of deities
Amatsukami